Our Mutual Friend is a 1976 British television serial adapted from Charles Dickens' 1865 novel Our Mutual Friend. The series was made by the BBC and ran during 1976 for a total of seven episodes.  It was directed by Peter Hammond.

The adaptation was by Julia Jones and Donald Churchill, who had written the ITV sitcom Moody and Pegg (1974–75). Their version excludes some minor characters in order to convey the action within the limitations of a seven-episode structure, but was praised by British reviewers for faithfully reproducing the mood and atmosphere of the original novel.

Cast and characters

Theme music

The theme music was composed by Carl Davis.

Critical reception
The stage-style filming of the serial was criticised, but a number of performances were singled out for praise, including that of Polly James as Jenny Wren.

References

External links
 
 

1970s British drama television series
1976 British television series debuts
1976 British television series endings
Films based on works by Charles Dickens
Television shows based on works by Charles Dickens
English-language television shows
Our Mutual Friend